The 2012 The Jewish Home leadership election was held on 5 November 2012 to elect the leader of The Jewish Home party. The election took place in advance of the 2013 Israeli legislative election. Naftali Bennett was elected as leader.

A month before the leadership election, incumbent leader Daniel Hershkowitz announced that he would not contend.

Candidates
Naftali Bennett
Yehuda Cohen
Zevulun Orlev

Bennett and Orlev were considered the top-two contenders. Bennett was considered a political newcomer. He had previously served as chief of staff to Prime Minister Benjamin Netanyahu when Netanyahu served as opposition leader, before becoming chairman of the Yesha Council. He also was the co-founder of the My Israel movement. Orlev was considered a stalwart of the party. He had previous led the National Religious Party, a predecessor party.

Electorate
The election was open to the party's nearly 54,000 members to vote in 168 polling stations across the nation.

Results

Aftermath
After his loss, Orlev announced that he would be retiring from the Knesset.

Bennett led the party until late 2018, when he left to co-found and lead the The New Right. He would serve as prime minister of Israel from 2021 through 2022.

References

Jewish Home leadership
2012
Jewish Home
Jewish Home leadership election
2012 Jewish Home leadership election